NGC 3245 is a lenticular galaxy in the constellation Leo Minor. It was discovered by William Herschel on April 11, 1785. It is a member of the NGC 3254 Group of galaxies, which is a member of the Leo II Groups, a series of galaxies and galaxy clusters strung out from the right edge of the Virgo Supercluster.

See also
 List of NGC objects (3001–4000)

References

External links
 

Lenticular galaxies
Leo Minor
3245
030744